Douglas James Nienhuis (born February 16, 1982 in Irvine, California) is a former American football offensive lineman. He was originally drafted by the Seattle Seahawks in the seventh round of the 2005 NFL Draft. He played college football at Oregon State.

Nienhuis has also been a member of the New York Jets, Houston Texans, and Denver Broncos in his career.

Early years
Nienhuis attended Woodbridge High School in Irvine, California, and won three varsity letters in basketball, two in football, and one in volleyball as a middle blocker. In football, he was a two-year starter and a two-time first-team All-Sea View League honoree.

College career
Nienhuis attended Oregon State University and was a photography major and played college football. In football, he won first-team All-Pacific-10 Conference honors as a senior, and second-team All-Pacific-10 Conference honors as a junior.

Professional career
Nienhuis was selected in the seventh round of the 2005 NFL Draft out of Oregon State University by the Seattle Seahawks, placed on practice squad, then later in the season activated by the New York Jets. In the 2005 season, he appeared in seven games for the Jets. He was waived by the Jets on September 2, 2006. He was later signed to the Houston Texans' practice squad. The Texans later waived him, but he was picked up the Denver Broncos. He was later waived the Broncos and was not signed by another NFL team.

References

External links
Denver Broncos bio
New York Jets bio

1982 births
Living people
Players of American football from California
American football offensive guards
American football offensive tackles
Oregon State Beavers football players
Seattle Seahawks players
Houston Texans players
New York Jets players
Denver Broncos players
Frankfurt Galaxy players
Sportspeople from Irvine, California